Balsan is a creator and manufacturer of textile (carpets and carpet tiles); it is the leading French producer of the sector and the fourth largest employer of the department/region of l’Indre. The company roots historically in the Royal Manufacture Château du Parc, which had been established in 1751 in Châteauroux.

History

The royal manufacture 
In 1751, Louis XV granted Jean Vaillé the right to create the Royal Manufacture close to Chateauroux, a pioneering city of the clothing industry. The foundations of the first buildings were laid in 1752 although the business really began in 1755. Despite difficult times, the Manufacture experienced periods of prosperity and quickly became the first business in Châteauroux and Sud-Berry. It also consolidates a strong local textile tradition that continues to this day. The factory has been the subject of numerous publications on the organization and respect for the lives of workers.

Balsan 

From 1856, the manufacture became associated with the name Balsan. Jean-Pierre Balsan bought it and gave it a second life. After he started working with his two sons Auguste and Charles, the company took the name of Balsan & Sons. Between 1860 and 1869, a new factory is designed by the architect Henry Dauvergne. His project was both innovative and ambitious: in addition to the 60,000 m² of workshops and warehouses it also included administrative buildings, a gas production plant, water towers, a worker township of 100 homes, a clinic. Its leaders Augustus and Charles Balsan lead in parallel political careers; they were both elected representative of the department of l’Indre. Charles advocates for a social and paternalistic capitalism. He works on women's employment laws, mutual aid and work accidents.

In 1912, the company took out its final form as a Limited Liability Company with a share capital of 9 million French old Francs. It became the "Anonymous Society of Balsan Establishments". It mainly produces fabric intended for making uniforms for the Armed Forces, including the "blue horizon" worn by the "Poilus" during the First World War, and the various public administrations.

The 1955 reconversion 
In 1954, Louis Balsan succeeded to his cousin François. After he graduated from Sciences Po and Harvard, he was deported during the Second World War. He made contact with American factories specializing in TUFT, a new textile production process used for creating carpets, bath mats, bedspreads... The company then diversified its activities by manufacturing five meters tufted carpets with unique machines in France.
The social development of the company continues with the introduction of paid internships and the construction of a day-nursery and a company restaurant. In 1972, Louis Balsan decides to build a new plant in Corbilly following the innovative concept of the era of "plant in the countryside". After its opening in June 1974, the plant experiences some difficulties which lead Louis to sell Balsan to Bidermann Textile Group in May 1975.

From 1975 to present days 
Carpets production gradually moved from Châteauroux to Arthon. Towards the end of 1982, all production activities were moved to Arthon and the Châteauroux plant was abandoned. Purchased by the city in 1988, the historic site of the Avenue of the Manufacture remains a structuring element of the city and an important place of life; it became the district Balsan, an eco-district of the town. In 1987, the Belgian Louis Poortere Group acquires General Textile Company Balsan and doubles the size of the plant to reach 45,000 m². Louis Poortere filed for bankruptcy in August 2000.

In January 2001, Associated Weavers International, a Belgian manufacturer of tufted and woven carpets and rugs took over the activities of the company. At that time, Balsan produces 10 million square meters of carpet per year with more than 200 employees on its two sites of Arthon and Neuvy (acquired in 1999). 45% of the production is exported (in 75 countries).

Corporate affairs

Corporate governance 
The Balsan company CEO is Bernard Guiraud.

Operating facilities 
Balsan is located in the department of l’Indre in central France on two industrial sites:
 The plant in Arthon, specializes in the manufacture of broadloom carpet and produces around 45,000 m2 per week, with a workforce of 220 employed staff .
 The plant in Neuvy-Saint-Sépulchre, 10,000 m2, specializes in the manufacture of carpet tiles and produces 10,000m2 per week, with a workforce of an additional 20 people.

Environmental record 
The company defines itself as a responsible company commits to sustainable development by focusing on 4 areas:
 The establishment of an environmental management system, whose objective is to get the NF EN ISO14001 certification
 Making efforts to reduce its consumption and limiting its impact on the environment,
 The integration of eco-design in its product development methods and processes,
 The development of a collection network and the recycling of carpet waste after use to involve all national players.

Products  
Balsan is owned by Belgotex International Group. It offers broadloom carpets and carpet tiles (more than 2000 item options of color and style: 70% of broadloom carpets, 30% of carpet tiles). The company markets its products through distribution partners or installation companies for offices, residencies and hotels. The Balsan company is focused on three market sectors: Office (22 collections), Home (24 collections) and Hotel (23 collections).

References

French companies established in 1751
Manufacturing companies established in 1751
Manufacturing companies of France
1751 establishments in France